Kamal Thapa (born 20 September 1981) is a retired Indian professional footballer who last played as a defender for ONGC in the I-League.

Career statistics

Club
Statistics accurate as of 11 May 2013

References

Indian footballers
1981 births
Living people
I-League players
ONGC FC players
Sportspeople from Varanasi
Footballers from Uttar Pradesh
Indian Gorkhas
Association football defenders